Gary Owen Lane (December 21, 1942 – June 27, 2003) was an American football quarterback and American football official.

Playing career
After graduating from East Alton-Wood River High School in Wood River, Illinois in 1961, Lane played college football at the University of Missouri from 1963 to 1966 and later in the National Football League (NFL) for three seasons with the Cleveland Browns and the New York Giants from 1966 to 1968. He also played one season in the Canadian Football League for the Saskatchewan Roughriders in 1970.

As an official
Following his playing career, Lane was an official in the NFL for 18 seasons from 1982 to 1999, serving as a side judge (1982-1991, 1998-1999) and referee (1992-1997). Lane was promoted to referee after Tom Dooley retired. 

He retired prior to the start of the 2000 NFL season after failing a physical.  As an official, Lane was assigned to Super Bowl XXIII in 1989 and Super Bowl XXXIII in 1999 (both in Miami Gardens, Florida) and wore the uniform number 120.  He was also the referee of the famous "Fake Spike" game in 1994 where Dan Marino faked a spike against the New York Jets and threw the winning touchdown pass at Giants Stadium.

Volunteer work
During the last three years of his life, Gary returned to his alma mater of East Alton - Wood River High School in Wood River, Illinois, and donated many hours as an assistant football coach; contributed his own funds to a scholarship program in his name; and served as a mentor for many of the football players during those years.

Death and legacy
Lane died unexpectedly in 2003 due to a heart attack. The Gary Lane Foundation, a youth program, has been established in his honor.

Family
Lane has two daughters, Patricia and Kristin. 
Lane's son-in-law is former Major League Baseball catcher and former Kansas City Royals manager Mike Matheny.

References

1942 births
2003 deaths
American football quarterbacks
American players of Canadian football
Canadian football quarterbacks
Cleveland Browns players
Missouri Tigers football players
National Football League officials
New York Giants players
Saskatchewan Roughriders players
High school football coaches in Illinois
People from Wood River, Illinois
Players of American football from Illinois